Andrea Nalini (born 20 June 1990) is an Italian footballer who plays as a forward for  club Virtus Verona.

Club career
On 31 January 2020, he signed a 1.5-year contract with Vicenza.

On 14 September 2021 he returned to Virtus Verona.

References

1990 births
Living people
Sportspeople from the Province of Verona
Footballers from Veneto
Italian footballers
Association football forwards
Serie A players
Serie B players
Serie C players
A.S.D. Villafranca players
Virtus Verona players
U.S. Salernitana 1919 players
F.C. Crotone players
L.R. Vicenza players